JPU Records is a British record label formed in 2012, which specializes in handling international releases by Japanese artists. Notable acts on JPU's roster include The Gazette, Band-Maid, Lovebites, and Nemophila.

History
The label was established in 2012. Its first release was Division by popular Japanese visual kei rock band The Gazette, followed by the 2013 album Beautiful Deformity. The label began to release albums by other Japanese acts, including i'mperfect by Ling tosite Sigure, Weeeeeeeeee!!! by Polysics, and Embrace by Boom Boom Satellites. In 2016 they announced the signing of rock quintet Band-Maid and pop singer Amatsuki, giving the two acts their UK debuts at MCM London Comic Con in May of that year.

Current roster
JPU Records has released albums by the following artists:

Aldious
Amatsuki
Asian Kung-Fu Generation
Band-Maid
Back-On
Bed In
 blank paper
Boom Boom Satellites (defunct)
Buck-Tick
Crystal Lake
Dempagumi.inc
Doll$Boxx
Elfriede
Ena Fujita
FEMM
Flow
The Gazette
Kari Band
Kemuri
Ladybaby
Lie and a Chameleon
Ling tosite Sigure
Lovebites
Lyrical School
 Man with a Mission
Mary's Blood
Moso Calibration
Mutant Monster
Nemophila
Niji no Conquistador
NoGoD
One Eye Closed
Passcode
Polysics
ROA
ROS
Scandal
Sin Isomer
 Sokoninaru
Spyair
Sumire Uesaka

References

External links
 Official website

Rock record labels
Record labels established in 2012
British record labels